Mayank Shekhar is an Indian film critic, journalist and author. He has been a film critic and a national cultural editor with Hindustan Times. He previously worked under Mumbai Mirror and MiD DAY. He also used to write a blog, Fad For Thought, at the Hindustan Times website. Currently, his reviews appear on his website theW14.com and also at the Dainik Bhaskar in different languages. He currently is the editorial head of Mid-Day entertainment.

Early life and education

Shekhar completed his schooling from Delhi Public School, R. K. Puram, Delhi in 1998 and thereafter graduated in Economics from St. Stephen's College, Delhi, in 2001 and moved to Mumbai thereafter. He currently resides at Chembur.

Career
Shekhar moved to Mumbai after his studies and started his career as film journalist, eventually he came to head the features team at Mumbai Mirror for two years and was also part of the Mid-Day features team for four years.

In 2006, Bombay Talkies, a book authored by Shekhar was published by Frog Books. The book is a compilation of film reviews written by Shekhar from 2004 to 2005. In a review, Bollywood Hungama wrote that the book "qualifies more as his [Shekhar's] personal portfolio or his extended resume."

Shekhar is a member of the Central Board of Film Certification. In 2004, he was one of 21 recipients of the 5th "Young Achievers Awards" by the Indo-American Film Society for his work as a film critic. In 2007 he was awarded with the Ramnath Goenka Award for Excellence in Journalism.

He currently runs a cinema website called theW14.com.

He has authored a bestselling book, Name Place Animal Thing.

Bibliography
Bombay Talkies, Frog Books (IND), 2006.
Name Place Animal Thing, 2016

References
https://www.amazon.in/Place-Animal-Thing-Mayank-Shekhar/dp/8175993154

External links
 Mayank Shekhar at Hindustan Times

Indian film critics
Living people
Indian male journalists
Indian male novelists
St. Stephen's College, Delhi alumni
Delhi Public School alumni
Year of birth missing (living people)